The Seven Stars is a Grade II listed public house in Falmouth, Cornwall. It was built in about 1800 and subsequently extended in 1912 to include an off-licence, which later became a shop. The building was made of rendered stone, though the modern building is made of brick, both parts having a slate roof.

History
The Seven Stars was supposedly opened in 1660 and so is the oldest pub in Falmouth, though the present building is dated to approximately 1800. The interior is dated to the 19th century, leading it to be listed on Campaign for Real Ale's National Inventory of Historic Pub Interiors.

A review in The Telegraph mentioned that the public house had a dated feel, due to the style of the interiors, but that it was a "total treasure". The building was designated Grade II listed building status on 6 June 2000.

The Seven Stars was in the hands of the same family for seven generations since 1853; for 60 years the Rev. Barrington Bennetts (an Anglican clergyman who died in 2011) was the licensee. The current landlady is his granddaughter.

Architecture
This three-storey public house was originally built in approximately 1800. During the 19th century, the building was re-fronted, and a lean-to extension was added at the rear of the building. A further extension on the right of the building is dated 1912, originally functioned as an off-licence, but now serves as a shop. The original building is made of rendered stone, while the modern addition is rendered brickwork. The roof for both parts are made of slate. At the corners of the building are raised quoins on the upper floors. 

The building has panelled doors off centre of the original building, and on the left hand side of the shop extension. At the top of the building, the eaves have a painted timber board displaying the name, The Seven Stars. Inside the bar has long rectangular panels, with simple shelves and there are seats built under the windows. The Seven Stars is unusual in that it still includes its panelling and features from the 19th century.

References

Grade II listed pubs in Cornwall
National Inventory Pubs
Buildings and structures in Falmouth, Cornwall